Yaxeni Milagros Oriquen-Garcia Perez (born September 3, 1966) is a Venezuelan-American retired professional bodybuilder.

Early life
Yaxeni Milagros Oriquen (born Yaxeni Milagros Oriquen Perez) was born on September 3, 1966, in Cabimas, Zulia, Venezuela, the youngest of nine children (four brothers and four sisters). She began a career in theater and modeling at an early age and studied theater while in Venezuela.

Bodybuilding career

Amateur
In 1989, Oriquen began dedicating herself to the sport of bodybuilding. She won four amateur contests in 1993, earning her professional card after winning Ibero (Central) American Championships. She then moved to the United States.

Professional

Her most noteworthy achievement as a professional has been winning the Ms. Olympia title in 2005. She is the most successful Venezuelan bodybuilder ever, by being the only one to win the Ms. Olympia title. She is the winner of five Ms. International titles, in 2002, 2003, 2005, 2008, and 2012. In 2011, she ranked as the second-best female bodybuilder in the International Federation of Bodybuilding and Fitness  Pro Women's Bodybuilding Ranking List.

Stats
 Height: 
 Off Season Weight: 
 Competition Weight:

Competition history
1993 Venezuelan Nationals - 1st
1993 Ibero American - 1st
1993 Southern American - 1st
1993 Central American Championships - 1st
1994 Jan Tana Classic - 10th
1994 IFBB Grand Prix Prague - 6th
1995 Jan Tana Classic - 9th
1995 IFBB Grand Prix Prague - 5th
1996 Jan Tana Classic - 12th
1996 IFBB Grand Prix Prague - 6th
1996 IFBB Grand Prix Slovakia - 6th
1997 Jan Tana Classic - 6th
1998 IFBB Ms. International - 11th
1998 Jan Tana Classic - 4th
1998 IFBB Ms. Olympia - 10th
1999 IFBB Ms. International - 18th
1999 Jan Tana Classic - 2nd
1999 Women's Pro Extravaganza - 3rd
1999 Pro World Championship - 6th
1999 IFBB Ms. Olympia - 10th
2000 IFBB Ms. International - 6th (HW)
2000 Jan Tana Classic - 5th (HW)
2000 IFBB Ms. Olympia - 4th (HW)
2001 IFBB Ms. International - 4th (HW)
2001 Jan Tana Classic - 2nd (HW)
2001 Women's Pro Extravaganza - 2nd (HW)
2001 IFBB Ms. Olympia - 3rd (HW)
2002 IFBB Ms. International- 1st (HW and Overall)
2002 GNC Show of Strength - 1st (HW and Overall)
2002 IFBB Ms. Olympia - 4th (HW)
2003 IFBB Ms. International - 1st (HW and Overall)
2003 IFBB Ms. Olympia - 3rd (HW)
2004 IFBB Ms. International - 2nd (HW)
2004 GNC Show of Strength - 1st (HW and Overall)
2004 IFBB Night of Champions - 1st (HW)
2004 IFBB Ms. Olympia - 3rd (HW)
2005 IFBB Ms. International - 1st (HW and Overall)
2005 IFBB Ms. Olympia - 1st
2006 IFBB Ms. International - 3rd
2006 IFBB Ms. Olympia - 7th
2007 IFBB Ms. International - 2nd
2007 IFBB Ms. Olympia - 3rd
2008 IFBB Ms. International - 1st
2008 IFBB Ms. Olympia - 3rd
2009 IFBB Ms. International - 3rd
2009 IFBB Ms. Olympia - 5th
2010 Phoenix Pro - 2nd
2010 IFBB Ms. International - 2nd
2010 IFBB Ms. Olympia - 2nd
2011 IFBB Ms. International - 2nd
2011 IFBB Ms. Olympia - 2nd
2012 IFBB Ms. International - 1st
2012 IFBB Ms. Olympia - 3rd
2013 IFBB Ms. International - 2nd
2013 IFBB Ms. Olympia - 4th
2014 IFBB Ms. Olympia - 5th
2015 IFBB Pro League WOS Rising Phoenix Pro Women's Bodybuilding - 4th
2016 IFBB Puerto Rico Pro - 3rd
2016 IFBB Omaha Pro - 2nd
2016 IFBB Lenda Murray Pro AM - 1st
2016 IFBB Pro League WOS Rising Phoenix Pro Women's Bodybuilding – 5th
2017 IFBB Pro League WOS Rising Phoenix Pro Women's Bodybuilding – 3rd
2020 IFBB WOS Ms. Olympia - 13th

Best statistics

 Biceps - 
 Bench press - 
 Calves - 
 Chest - 
 Height - 
 On season weight:
  (1999 Ms. Olympia)
  (2003 Ms. Olympia)
  (2004 Ms. Olympia)
  (2005 Ms. Olympia)
  (19 September 2013)
  (2014 Ms. Olympia)
 Quads -

Personal life
In 1990, Oriquen had her only son, Luis Alcala, and currently resides in Miami, Florida, where she is the owner of Rypt gym Miami and work there as a personal trainer and fitness nutrition. She is an evangelical Christian.

References

External links
Official website

| colspan = 3 align = center | Ms. Olympia 
|- 
| width = 30% align = center | Preceded by:Iris Kyle
| width = 40% align = center | First (2005)
| width = 30% align = center | Succeeded by:Iris Kyle

| colspan = 3 align = center | Ms. International 
|- 
| width = 30% align = center | Preceded by:Vickie Gates
| width = 40% align = center | First (2002)
| width = 30% align = center | Succeeded by:Herself
|- 
| width = 30% align = center | Preceded by:Herself
| width = 40% align = center | Second (2003)
| width = 30% align = center | Succeeded by:Iris Kyle
|- 
| width = 30% align = center | Preceded by:Iris Kyle
| width = 40% align = center | Third (2005)
| width = 30% align = center | Succeeded by:Iris Kyle
|- 
| width = 30% align = center | Preceded by:Iris Kyle
| width = 40% align = center | Fourth (2008)
| width = 30% align = center | Succeeded by:Iris Kyle
|- 
| width = 30% align = center | Preceded by:Iris Kyle
| width = 40% align = center | Fifth (2012)
| width = 30% align = center | Succeeded by:Iris Kyle

1966 births
American evangelicals
American female bodybuilders
Living people
Professional bodybuilders
Sportspeople from Miami
Venezuelan evangelicals
Venezuelan expatriate sportspeople in the United States
Venezuelan female bodybuilders
21st-century American women